Boscia arabica is a species of plant in the Capparaceae family. It is found in Oman and Yemen. It is threatened by habitat loss.

References

arabica
Vulnerable plants
Taxonomy articles created by Polbot